The 2000 Omaha Beef season was the team's inaugural season as a football franchise and first in the Indoor Professional Football League (IPFL). One of seven teams competing in the IPFL for the 2000 season. The team played their home games at the Omaha Civic Auditorium in Omaha, Nebraska.

Schedule

Regular season

Standings
1. Portland Prowlers, 11-5

2. Mississippi Fire Dogs, 11-5

3. Omaha Beef, 8-8

4. Mobile Seagulls, 8-8

5. Louisiana Rangers, 9-7

6. Idaho Stallions, 5-11

7. Shreveport-Bossier Bombers, 5-11

Playoffs

Roster

References

Omaha Beef
Omaha Beef seasons
Indoor Professional Football League
Omaha